Matheson is a surname derived from either an anglicised form of Scottish Gaelic surnames or the patronymic form of a short form of the English Matthew. This English personal name is ultimately derived from the Hebrew Mattathia, which means "gift of God". An early record form of the surname Matheson is Mathyson, recorded in 1392; this recorded name literally means "son of Mathi"—Mathi being a pet form of Matthew. Two different Scottish Gaelic surnames have been Anglicised Matheson. One such surname is Mac Mhathghamhuin (Clan Matheson), which became Anglicised Matheson on account of its similar sound. This Gaelic surname is of an entirely different etymology than Matheson, as the Gaelic mathghamhuin means "bear". Another Gaelic surname Anglicised Matheson is Mac Matha. This Gaelic surname is derived from the patronymic form of a Gaelic form of Matthew (for example, the modern Scottish Gaelic Mata and Matha are cognates of the English Matthew).

People with the surname
Alexander Matheson (disambiguation), multiple people
Angus Matheson (1912–1962), inaugural Professor of Celtic at the University of Glasgow
Arthur Matheson, Canadian politician
Bob Matheson, National Football League player
Charlie Matheson, fictional character in Revolution
Chris Matheson, British politician
Dan Matheson, Canadian television sportscaster, host & news reader
Danny Matheson, fictional character in Revolution
Diana Matheson, Canadian football (soccer) midfielder
Donald Macleod Matheson CBE (1896-1979), Secretary of the National Trust, Traditionalist author
Ewing Matheson (1840-1917), British civil engineer and consulting engineer
George Matheson (1842-1906), Scottish theologian
Guy Matheson (1952- ), Australian politician
Hans Matheson, Scottish actor
Hilda Matheson (1888-1940), first Director of Talks at the BBC
Hugh Matheson, British oarsman
Hugh Mackay Mateson, (1821-1898), Scottish industrialist
James Matheson, Scottish businessman
Jim Matheson, American politician, son of Scott M. Matheson
John Matheson, Canadian politician
Karen Matheson, Scottish folk musician
Kay Matheson, Teacher, Gaelic scholar, one of four students involved in the 1950 removal of the Stone of Scone.
Louis Matheson, British-Australian academic
Luke Matheson (2002-), English footballer
Mal Matheson, New Zealand cricketer
Michael Matheson (disambiguation), multiple people
Miki Matheson, Japanese Paralympic gold medalist
Norma Matheson, American politician, former First Lady of Utah
Rachel Matheson (disambiguation), fictional characters
Richard Matheson, American writer
Richard Christian Matheson, American writer, son of Richard Matheson
Robert Matheson (architect)
Robert Matheson (entomologist)
Robert (Bob) Matheson, National Football League player
Robert J. Matheson (1907-1956), American politician and businessman
Roderick N. Matheson, American Civil War figure
Scott Milne Matheson, Sr. (1897–1958), US Attorney for Utah 1949-1953
Scott M. Matheson (Utah governor) (1929–1990), son of the above, governor of Utah 1977-1985
Scott Matheson, Jr. (born 1953), son of the above, US Attorney for Utah from 1993–1997, currently a judge on the 10th United States Circuit Court
Shirlee Matheson, Canadian children's writer
Tim Matheson, American actor
William Matheson (Gaelic scholar) (1910-1995), Scottish Gaelic scholar, and ordained minister of the Church of Scotland
William John Matheson, American industrialist

Notes

See also
Mathieson
Mathison
Matthiessen

References

Scottish surnames
Patronymic surnames
Surnames from given names